Totoy Hitman is a 1996 Philippine action film edited and directed by Pepe Marcos. The film stars Ian Veneracion as the title role.

Cast
 Ian Veneracion as Totoy
 Edu Manzano as Allan
 Jennifer Mendoza as Melissa
 Jorge Estregan as Mael
 Lara Morena as Hilda
 Celina Cortez as Karen
 Lito Legaspi as Anton
 Charlie Davao as Miguel
 Roldan Aquino as Col. Mercado
 Levi Ignacio as Allan's Aide
 Marita Zobel as Carmen
 Pocholo Montes as Gen. Dionisio
 Zandro Zamora as Jessie
 Johnny Vicar as Santiago
 Rhey Roldan as Hostagetaker
 Jim Rosales as Totoy's Father
 Robert Rivera as Delfin

References

External links

1996 films
1996 action films
Films directed by Pepe Marcos
Filipino-language films
Philippine action films
GMA Pictures films
OctoArts Films films